Addison Village Hall was a historic village hall located at Addison in Steuben County, New York. It was built in 1906 and is a four-story, greyish brown brick rectangular structure.  The facade featured a projecting center pavilion that reaches five stories and is flanked by identical two story, one bay wings.  It was demolished in 1994 and the site is now occupied by the Old Village Hall Memorial Park.

It was listed on the National Register of Historic Places in 1980.

References

City and town halls on the National Register of Historic Places in New York (state)
Government buildings completed in 1906
Buildings and structures in Steuben County, New York
Village halls in the United States
National Register of Historic Places in Steuben County, New York
1906 establishments in New York (state)
Buildings and structures demolished in 1994
Demolished buildings and structures in New York (state)